Cordelia Botkin (1854 – March 7, 1910) was an American murderer who sent a box of poisoned candy to her ex-lover's wife. This was the first American prosecution for a crime which took place in two different jurisdictions, as Botkin had sent the poison from California, but it was received in Delaware.

Background
Botkin was born in Polk County, Missouri in 1854. She later moved with her family to California, where she married her husband, Welcome Botkin. They were the parents of one son.

In 1895, Botkin met John Preston Dunning while he was bicycling in San Francisco's Golden Gate Park. At the time she was 41 years old, nine years his senior. Both of them were married, but Dunning was smitten with her. Dunning was a highly regarded reporter for the Associated Press, having completed overseas assignments in Samoa and Chile. He had been promoted to superintendent of the Associated Press's Western Division bureau in San Francisco.

In 1896, Dunning's wife, Mary Elizabeth (Penington) Dunning, upset by her husband's marital indiscretions, left him and returned with their daughter to Dover, Delaware, to the home of her father, former Congressman John B. Penington. By then Botkin had become Dunning's lover and constant companion. Botkin was estranged from her own husband, a grain broker in Stockton, California, but he supported her with regular remittances. Dunning, a heavy drinker, was fired by the Associated Press when it was discovered that he had embezzled $4,000 in office funds to pay his gambling debts. He was next let go by newspapers in Salt Lake City and San Francisco because of his habitual drunkenness. He then moved into Botkin's hotel.

The affair lasted almost three years but ended when Dunning was re-hired in March 1898 as the agency's lead reporter for what would become the Spanish–American War. When he left San Francisco, he told the weeping Botkin that he would not return. He reconciled with his wife before leaving for Cuba, where he helped save survivors of the Spanish battleships that were sunk at the Battle of Santiago de Cuba on July 2, 1898.

Murders
Cordelia Botkin sent anonymous letters to Elizabeth Dunning detailing her husband's affairs. On August 9, 1898, Elizabeth opened a box of candies addressed to her and her sister in Dover, Delaware. It was only "With love to yourself and baby." "Passionately fond of candy," according to her husband, Dunning took at least three pieces herself and shared the rest with others on the porch of her father's home. After two days in agony, Elizabeth and her older sister, 44-year-old Ida Harriet Deane, died from arsenic poisoning. Four others who had sampled the chocolates survived. Elizabeth's father remarked upon the familiar handwriting on the note and saw that it matched the taunting letters he had kept in a drawer. Police traced the candy to a shop in San Francisco, and from there, to Botkin.

Trial
Botkin was tried before Judge Carroll Cook. District Attorney, Lewis Francis Byington prosecuted Cordelia Botkin in the murder trial on April 30, 1904.

She was convicted of murder in December 1898, appealed, and was convicted again at a retrial in 1904. She was sentenced to life imprisonment.

Death
Botkin was initially imprisoned in San Francisco, but after the 1906 San Francisco earthquake was transferred to San Quentin State Prison, where she died in 1910. John Dunning, his career destroyed by the revelations during the trial, died two years earlier in Philadelphia.

References

Other sources

Transcript on Appeal: People of the State of California, respondent, versus Cordelia Botkin, defendant. Complaint 12,579. San Francisco Superior Court Criminal Case 632. Filed 29 February 1900, with Supreme Court of State of California. Item W.P.A. No. 29080 and 27069, California State Archives, Sacramento, CA. (Original trial records were destroyed in the earthquake and fire in San Francisco in April 1906.)
Offord, Lenore: "The Gifts of Cordelia: The Case of Cordelia Botkin" in "San Francisco Murders," ed. Joseph Henry Jackson.New York: Dual, Sloan, and Pierce, 1947.
Tales of Love and Hate in Old San Francisco, Millie Robbins. Chronicle Books, San Francisco 1971

External links
The Botkin Case by Jim Fisher

1854 births
1910 deaths
1898 murders in the United States
19th-century American criminals
20th-century American criminals
19th-century American women
20th-century American women
American people convicted of murder
American female murderers
American female criminals
Criminals from Missouri
People convicted of murder by California
American prisoners sentenced to life imprisonment
American people who died in prison custody
Prisoners who died in California detention
Prisoners sentenced to life imprisonment by California
Poisoners
20th-century American people